The 2014–15 season of the Frauen-Bundesliga was the 25th season of Germany's premier women's football league. The season began on 30 August 2014 and ended on 10 May 2015. VfL Wolfsburg were the defending champions.

This season was the first to be sponsored by a company. Allianz bought the rights and the league is known as the Allianz-Frauen Bundesliga. As a direct result, each team got €100,000 per season.

Bayern Munich won the Bundesliga title for the first time, and their second German championship overall.

Teams
The teams promoted from the previous 2. Bundesliga season were SC Sand as winners of the Southern division and Herforder SV as winners of the Northern division. BV Cloppenburg and VfL Sindelfingen were relegated.

League table
Frankfurt also qualified for the Champions League as title holders.

Results

Scorers

Top scorers

Célia Šašić defended her top-scorer title from last year.

References

External links
News, Matchdetails, Teams, Transfers on weltfussball.de
Season on dfb.de

2014-15
1